The following lists events that have happened in 1907 in the Qajar dynasty.

Incumbents
 Monarch: Mozaffar al-Din Shah Qajar (until January 3), Mohammad Ali Shah Qajar (starting January 3)
 Prime Minister: 
 until March 7: Nasrullah Moshir al-Dowleh 
 March 7-March 17: vacant
 March 17-April 29: Soltan-Ali Vazir-e Afkham 
 April 29-May 4: vacant 
 May 4-August 31: Ali-Asghar Khan Atabak 
 August 31-September 16: vacant
 September 16-October 27: Ahmad Moshir al-Saltaneh 
 October 27-December 21: Abolqasem Naser al-Molk 
 starting December 21: Hossein-Qoli Nezam al-Saltaneh Mafi

Events
 January 8 – Mohammad Ali Shah Qajar ascended to the crown.
 August – an Anglo-Russian agreement divided Iran into two zones of interests: a Russian zone in the North and a British zone in the South.

Death
 January 3 – Mozaffar ad-Din Shah Qajar died in Tehran at the age of 53.

References

 
Iran
Years of the 20th century in Iran
1900s in Iran
Iran